Pasarroyo (formerly Corporate Center Pasadena) is a four building complex with 640,000 square feet of commercial space. It spans a full city block on S. Lake Avenue in Downtown Pasadena. It is the largest office campus in Pasadena.

Major tenants 

 LA Fitness
 Dunkin' Donuts
 Northern Trust
 Urban Plates
 Barrister Executive Suites

See also 
 List of buildings in Pasadena, California

References

External links 
 

Buildings and structures in Pasadena, California
Office buildings completed in 1981
1981 establishments in California